The Río Jamapa is located in the Mexican state of  Veracruz, forming in Citlaltépetl (also known as Pico de Orizaba) and pouring into the Gulf of Mexico in the municipality of Boca del Río (Mouth of the River).

See also
List of longest rivers of Mexico

References

Rivers of Veracruz
Drainage basins of the Gulf of Mexico